Vladimir Yevgenyevich Isaychev (born April 21, 1986) is a Russian professional road racing cyclist who rode most recently for UCI ProTeam .

Major results

2007
 10th Grand Prix of Moscow
2012
 1st Stage 5 Tour de Suisse
2013
 1st  Road race, National Road Championships
2015
 1st Stage 3 Vuelta a Burgos
 1st Prologue (TTT) Tour of Austria

Grand Tour general classification results timeline

References

External links

 Official site of Vladimir Isaychev

1986 births
Living people
Cyclists at the 2012 Summer Olympics
Olympic cyclists of Russia
Sportspeople from Samara, Russia
Russian male cyclists
Tour de Suisse stage winners